Valley of Fire State Park is a public recreation and nature preservation area covering nearly  located  south of Overton, Nevada. The state park derives its name from red sandstone formations, the Aztec Sandstone, which formed from shifting sand dunes 150 million years ago. These features, which are the centerpiece of the park's attractions, often appear to be on fire when reflecting the sun's rays. It is Nevada's oldest state park, as commemorated with Nevada Historical Marker #150. It was designated as a National Natural Landmark in 1968.

It abuts the Lake Mead National Recreation Area on the east at the Virgin River confluence. It lies in a  basin.

Geology

Complex uplifting and faulting of the region, followed by extensive erosion, have created the present landscape. The rough floor and jagged walls of the park contain brilliant formations of eroded sandstone and sand dunes more than 150 million years old. Other important rock formations include limestones, shales, and conglomerates.

History 

Prehistoric inhabitants of the Valley of Fire included the Ancestral Puebloans, also known as the Anasazi, who were farmers from the nearby fertile Moapa Valley. Their approximate span of occupation has been dated from 300 BC to 1150 AD. Their visits probably involved hunting, food gathering, and religious ceremonies, although scarcity of water would have limited their stay. Fine examples of rock art (petroglyphs) left by these ancient peoples can be found at several sites within the park.

Work on the park was initiated by the Civilian Conservation Corps in 1933. During the years of their employment, which continued into the early 1940s, the CCC workers built campgrounds, trails, stone visitor cabins, ramadas, and roads. The park opened in 1934; it achieved official designation by the state legislature in 1935.

Climate 
The Valley of Fire State Park has a dry and warm climate typical of the Mojave Desert in which it lies. Storms moving east from the Pacific Ocean occasionally bring rain during winter months. Thunderstorms from the Southwestern Monsoon can produce heavy showers during summer. The average annual precipitation is 6.50" (165.1mm).

Valley of Fire Road 

Valley of Fire Road is the main road accessing and traversing through the park. The  section of the road between the east and west entrances of the park was officially designated as a Nevada Scenic Byway on June 30, 1995.

Activities and amenities
The park has a visitors center plus facilities for picnicking, camping, and hiking. Petroglyphs are seen throughout the park, with Mouse's Tank and Atlatl Rock two areas in particular with numerous petroglyphs that are relatively easily accessible. The park also preserves three stone cabins built by the Civilian Conservation Corps.

Film history

Valley of Fire is a popular location for shooting automobile commercials and other commercial photography. It has provided a setting for the following films and television shows:
 Viva Las Vegas starring Elvis Presley had multiple shots filmed in the park during the racing scenes for the film's finale in 1963.
 The Professionals with Burt Lancaster, Lee Marvin, and Claudia Cardinale was filmed in 1966. Valley of Fire was one of three locations used in the film. All that remains of the set is a portion of a rock wall of a hacienda.
 The outside Mars scenes from Total Recall, starring Arnold Schwarzenegger, were almost totally shot in Valley of Fire.
 The scenes from planet Veridian III from Star Trek Generations were filmed here in 1994. The Silica Dome is particularly highlighted for Star Trek fans as the site of iconic starship captain James T. Kirk's death and burial.

See also

Red Rock Canyon National Conservation Area
Little Finland and Gold Butte Backcountry Byway
Moapa River Indian Reservation

References

External links

Valley of Fire State Park Nevada State Parks
Valley of Fire State Park Trail Map Nevada State Parks

State parks of Nevada
Parks in Clark County, Nevada
Protected areas of the Mojave Desert
Protected areas established in 1935
1935 establishments in Nevada
Civilian Conservation Corps in Nevada
Landforms of Clark County, Nevada
Geologic formations with imbedded sand dunes
Petroglyphs in Nevada
Rock formations of Nevada
Sandstone in the United States
National Natural Landmarks in Nevada
Nevada historical markers